NGC 5682 is a spiral galaxy located in Boötes. It had a supernovae called SN 2005ci.

References

External links 
 
 

Barred spiral galaxies
5682
09388
052107
Boötes